is a railway station on the Hokuriku Main Line in the city of Sabae, Fukui Prefecture, Japan, operated by the West Japan Railway Company (JR West).

Lines

Station layout
The station consists of one island platform connected to the station building by a footbridge. The station is unattended.

Platforms

Adjacent stations

History
Kita-Sabae Station opened on 1 May 1955.  With the privatization of Japanese National Railways (JNR) on 1 April 1987, the station came under the control of JR West.

Passenger statistics
In fiscal 2016, the station was used by an average of 477 passengers daily (boarding passengers only).

Surrounding area
Higashibu Industrial Park

See also
 List of railway stations in Japan

References

External links

  

Railway stations in Fukui Prefecture
Stations of West Japan Railway Company
Railway stations in Japan opened in 1955
Hokuriku Main Line
Sabae, Fukui